The  (Latin for "shroud tunic") is a simple sleeveless white linen shift worn by British Monarchs during part of the Coronation service. It symbolises divesting oneself of all worldly vanity and standing bare before God. 

Wearing these garments, the monarch is invested with the regalia, crowned and enthroned. Both garments are removed before the final procession out of the abbey. Both of these robes are of very ancient design; those used by the medieval kings of England were said to have been used by King Edward the Confessor at his coronation in 1043, however these were destroyed by the Parliamentarians after the English Civil War. In modern times, a new  has been made for each coronation.

References

See also
Colobium

British monarchy
Ceremonial clothing
English clothing
Regalia
Court uniforms and dress